Alexandru Borbely II (27 November 1910, in Romania – 26 August 1987) was a Romanian football midfielder and coach. His brother Iuliu Borbely was also a national team footballer, they played together at Juventus București, Belvedere București and ASCAM București.

International career
Alexandru Borbely played five games for Romania, making his debut in a 3–0 victory against Bulgaria. Borbely played two games at the 1929–31 Balkan Cup and one game at the 1931–1934 Central European Cup for Amateurs, both tournaments being won by Romania. He was part of Romania's squad at the 1930 World Cup without playing.

Honours
Romania
Balkan Cup: 1929–31
Central European International Cup: 1931–34

References

External links

Romania international footballers
1930 FIFA World Cup players
Association football midfielders
Footballers from Bucharest
Liga I players
Liga II players
FC Petrolul Ploiești players
1910 births
1987 deaths
Romanian footballers